Suman Shashi Kant (सुमन शशि काँत) is an Indian soap opera actress, model and dancer. Now She is doing Swastik Productions "Meri Saasu Maa " on Zee TV. She played the role of Badi Thakurain in Phir Subah Hogi (TV series) along with Varun Badola and also played a role of Manda Tai in Ek Mutthi Aasmaan (TV series) with Shilpa Shirodkar. She did her schooling from Madhya Pradesh. After completing college, she started working to fulfill her ambition to become an actor. Nowadays, she is associated with Kausalya Charitable Trust.

Filmography
Suman appears in a movie

1. Tryst with destiny... A journey, A life produced by Miniboxoffice.
2. Hope In The Dark produced by Sourya Music

Television

Stage performances 
In 2013, Suman Shashi Kant performed at Zee Rishtey Awards, an award show for Zee TV actors. It aired on December 1, 2013 on Zee TV. In the same event, she also performed a dance number with Alok Nath on the song of Gandi Baat from the film R... Rajkumar.

References

Sources
1. http://epaper.bhaskarhindi.com/c/2017982 Chhindwara 18 September 2013
2. http://www.india.com/showbiz/alok-naths-dirty-secret-revealed-4862/
3. http://epaper.patrika.com/c/3945789 Patrika Gwalior 28 November 2014.
4. http://www.bhaskar.com/news/MP-GWA-t-4822132-NOR.html Dainik Bhaskar 28 November 2014.
5. http://www.zeetv.com/shows/meri-saasu-maa/cast/suman-kanth-as-maasi-ma-shashikala-devi.html
6. http://epaper.bhaskarhindi.com/c/10508649 23 May 2016
7 http://www.nettv4u.com/celebrity/hindi/tv-actress/suman-shashi-kant
8. http://www.tellychakkar.com/celebs/tv/suman-shashi-kant
9. http://naiduniaepaper.jagran.com/Article_detail.aspx?id=1352&boxid=43743&ed_date=2017-2-27&ed_code=40&ed_page=13 Chhindwara 27 Feb 2017

External links

 https://www.facebook.com/sumanshashikantofficial/
 https://twitter.com/SumanSkant
 https://instagram.com/SumanSkant
 http://epaper.patrika.com/c/9186659
 http://epaper.bhaskarhindi.com/c/2017982
 http://www.tvtalks.in/Celebrity/Celebrityimages.aspx?Celebrity=816
 http://epaper.patrika.com/745626/Indore-Patrika/11-03-2016#page/13/1
 http://epaper.dainiknavajyoti.com/?edition=7&pub_date=15/03/2016&pageno=13 Kota 15 March 2016
 http://naiduniaepaper.jagran.com/epaper/27-feb-2017-40-Chhindwara-edition-Bhopal.html
 https://www.youtube.com/watch?v=qCJ9PnaJKVo

Living people
Actresses from Madhya Pradesh
Indian soap opera actresses
Indian television actresses
Indian voice actresses
Actresses in Hindi television
21st-century Indian actresses
Year of birth missing (living people)